Dauncey is a European surname.

The surname had several spelling variations, including:

 Dancey
 Dauncy
 Dauntsey
 Dance
 Dancie
 Dauncie
 Dauntsie

People 

People with the surname Dauncey, include:

 Bert Dauncey (1871–1955), Welsh international rugby union player
 Derek Dauncey (born 1965), English rally car manager
 Gilbert Dauncey (born 1936), Welsh cricketer 
Harry Moore Dauncey (1863-1832), Christian missionary to Papua New Guinea 
 Jaime Dauncey, Canadian professional wrestler

References